Jeffrey Wilkins (born March 9, 1955) is an American former professional basketball player who played in the National Basketball Association (NBA) and other leagues. A 6'11" 230 lb center born in Chicago, Illinois, Wilkins played college basketball at Illinois State University and was selected with the 15th pick in the 2nd round of the 1977 NBA Draft by the San Antonio Spurs.

He signed with the Spurs in July 1977 but was waived prior to the start of the 1977–78 NBA season. He began his NBA playing career in 1980 with the Utah Jazz and spent the majority of it with them, but due to a mid-season trade played out part of his final year with the Spurs in 1986.

He holds career NBA averages of 7.9 points, 5.7 rebounds and 1.0 assist per game.  Wilkins also won a Turkish Basketball League championship with Efes Pilsen.

Personal 
Wilkins' son John is a professional basketball player as well, and has played for several teams in Africa and Europe.

Notes

External links
NBA stats @ basketballreference.com

1955 births
Living people
21st-century African-American people
African-American basketball players
American expatriate basketball people in France
American expatriate basketball people in Italy
American expatriate basketball people in the Philippines
American expatriate basketball people in Turkey
American men's basketball players
AMG Sebastiani Basket players
Anadolu Efes S.K. players
Basketball players from Chicago
Centers (basketball)
Hawaii Volcanos players
Illinois State Redbirds men's basketball players
Junior college men's basketball players in the United States
Le Mans Sarthe Basket players
Olympique Antibes basketball players
Parade High School All-Americans (boys' basketball)
Philippine Basketball Association imports
San Antonio Spurs draft picks
San Antonio Spurs players
Utah Jazz players
20th-century African-American sportspeople